Geyuan may refer to:

Geyuan, Jiangxi, a town in Hengfeng County, Jiangxi, China
Geyuan Garden, a garden and tourist attraction in Yangzhou, Jiangsu, China

See also
Geyuan Temple, a Buddhist temple in Laiyuan County, Hebei, China